Pimelea physodes, commonly known as Qualup bell, is a species of shrub that is endemic to Western Australia. It has egg-shaped to narrow elliptical leaves and distinctive bell-like inflorescences with tiny greenish flowers surrounded by long elliptical bracts. The inflorescence resembles those of some of the only distantly-related darwinia "bells" and the bracts are a combination of red, purple, green and cream-coloured.

Description
The flowers are arranged in a bell-like inflorescence similar to those of some species of the distantly related darwinias, especially Darwinia macrostegia, (Mondurup bell). The flowers are mostly bisexual but a few are female. Each group of flowers is surrounded by three or four pairs of green and cream-coloured bracts, usually also with varying amounts of red or purple. Flowering occurs from July to October.

Taxonomy and naming
Pimelea physodes was first formally described in 1852 by William Jackson Hooker in his book Icones Plantarum, from material collected by James Drummond. The specific epithet (physodes) is from an ancient Greek word meaning "a pair of bellows", referring to the paired bracts around the flowers.

Distribution and habitat
Qualup bell grows on sandplains and hillsides in the near-coastal region between the Pallarup Nature Reserve, Fitzgerald River National Park, Jarramungup and Mount Desmond near Ravensthorpe.

Ecology
Gregory John Keighery has recorded the tawny-crowned honeyeater (Gliciphila meanops) as a probable pollinator of the Qualup bell.

Conservation status
This pimelea is classified as "not threatened" by the Western Australian Government Department of Parks and Wildlife.

References

physodes
Endemic flora of Western Australia
Rosids of Western Australia
Malvales of Australia
Plants described in 1852